Kidderminster Register Office is the former Register Office for the town of Kidderminster, Worcestershire, England. As such, it was a designated venue for the performance of civil marriage ceremonies.

The listed building was formerly part of King Charles I School. The location is now a dance studio and the former grounds and attached education centre has been developed into a small housing estate.

References

External links 
 Official web page

Former school buildings in the United Kingdom

Buildings and structures in Kidderminster